Malcolm McKenzie (May 31, 1863 – March 15, 1913) was a Canadian politician who served as a member of the Legislative Assembly of Alberta and, briefly, as Alberta Provincial Treasurer.

Early life 
Malcolm McKenzie was born in Kincardine, Ontario, in 1863. He attended Queen's University, from which he graduated with a gold medal in philosophy, and then studied for a year in Toronto, Ontario. He came west around 1888 and, after a brief stay in Calgary, North-West Territories (NWT), settled in Fort Macleod, NWT, where he joined the law firm Haultain, McKenzie and McNeill. That firm dissolved when its senior partner, Frederick W. A. G. Haultain, went to Regina to serve as the first Premier of the Northwest Territories. McKenzie established another law firm with John McDonald and another lawyer; that firm was called McDonald, Martin and McKenzie.

Political career 
McKenzie first sought office in the 1904 federal election, when he ran as the Liberal candidate in Alberta (Provisional District). He was narrowly defeated by John Herron of the rival Liberal-Conservative Party. When the province of Alberta was created out of the North-West Territories in 1905, McKenzie then ran in the 1905 Alberta election, the province's first, as the Liberal candidate in Macleod, where he handily defeated his two opponents. In the first legislature he, along with most members from the province's south, favoured Calgary over Edmonton as the Alberta's permanent capital; his side was out-voted 16 to 8. He also proposed the successful name for Granum, located in his district and hitherto known as Leavings Switch; the area around Granum was known as excellent grain land, and "granum" is Latin for grain.

In the 1909 election, McKenzie was re-elected in the new district of Claresholm, by a margin still larger than the one he had achieved in 1905.  During the Alberta and Great Waterways Railway scandal, he remained loyal to the Liberal government of Alexander Cameron Rutherford; when that government fell, he transferred his allegiance to the new Liberal government of Arthur Sifton, though several other former Rutherford partisans (including Rutherford himself) opposed the new regime. His loyalty was rewarded in May 1912 when Sifton appointed him Provincial Treasurer. In keeping with the era's custom, McKenzie responded to the cabinet appointment by resigning his seat in the legislature to contest it in a by-election. Despite his previous wide margins, in 1912 he carried Claresholm by only 14 votes.

McKenzie's tenure as treasurer was not to last long: he caught a chill while attending the convention that nominated him as the Liberals' Claresholm candidate in the 1913 election, and by the time he returned to Edmonton on March 10, 1913, he was sufficiently ill to confine himself to bed. He had developed peritonitis, and died from it early in the morning of March 15, 1913. The Liberal Edmonton Bulletin, in mourning his passing, said that "no lawyer in the province had such a firm grasp in legal matters. No member of the house performed his legislative duties so admirably and so well. He has left his impression on more legislation than any other member."  He was survived by a wife and one son.

Electoral record

Provincial elections

Federal elections

References

Notes 

1913 deaths
Alberta Liberal Party MLAs
Lawyers in Alberta
Candidates in the 1904 Canadian federal election
People from Bruce County
People from the Municipal District of Willow Creek No. 26
Queen's University at Kingston alumni
1863 births
Members of the Executive Council of Alberta
Liberal Party of Canada candidates for the Canadian House of Commons